Kucharczyk is a Polish family name, derived from the occupation of kucharz, i.e., cook. It may refer to:

 Alfred Kucharczyk (1937–2020), Polish gymnast
 Antoni Kucharczyk (1874–1944), Polish poet
 Karolina Kucharczyk (born 1991), Polish Paralympic athlete
 Krzysztof Kucharczyk (born 1957), Polish Olympic pistol shooter
 Michał Kucharczyk (born 1991), Polish footballer
 Radim Kucharczyk (born 1979), Czech ice hockey player

Polish-language surnames
Occupational surnames